Amelia Rose Baldwin (born August 1, 1986) is an American film and television actress, best known for her portrayal of southern sweetheart Sarah-Sue in the Cannes Film Festival film "FSNF".  She has also guest starred on Hawaii Five-0, Grimm, Criminal Minds, Sullivan & Son, Zach Stone Is Gonna Be Famous, CSI:NY and others.

Early life 
Rose was born Amelia Rose Baldwin in Austin, Texas. Amelia graduated Valedictorian of her high school class, while simultaneously receiving her associate degree and a 4-year full paid scholarship to college. She then moved to study Mathematics and Theatre in Denver, Colorado. While in school, Rose participated in an abundance of theatre as well as commercials and independent films. She was discovered by a former NBC Network Casting Director turned agent and subsequently moved to Los Angeles, California.

Baldwin Rose is a verified member of Mensa International.

Career 
She has guest starred on the hit show Hawaii Five-0, as well as Grimm,  Criminal Minds, Sullivan & Son, and CSI: NY. She most notably starred opposite Gary Busey in the film Freaky Saturday Night Fever, which has been recognized at the Cannes Film Festival, New York International Independent Film and Video Festival, Philadelphia Film Festival, Beverly Hills Film Festival.  On October 27, 2012, Rose's most recent Lifetime film Stalked at 17 aired. Rose is represented by Hervey/Grimes Talent Agency and managed by Torque Entertainment.

Theatre 
Recently Amelia was featured in the Los Angeles Times for her theatre production WAR BRIDE, for which she received the Scenie award for Outstanding Performance by a Supporting Actress in a Drama from Stage Scene LA.

Filmography

Films

Television

References

External links 
 

1987 births
Living people
20th-century American actresses
21st-century American actresses
American film actresses
American television actresses
Actresses from Los Angeles
Actresses from Austin, Texas